KSENIASCHNAIDER is a Kyiv-based brand which led by Ksenia and Anton Schnaider. The brand was established in 2011, but gained a worldwide recognition in 2016 with the invention of demi-denims. The model was created as a combination of the culottes and the skinny jeans.

History 
Ksenia Schnaider started to create the first pair of jeans from second-hand denim, which led the designers to develop this into an ongoing project. Upcycling has proved to be a great tool for the designers. At the moment Ksenia Schnaider has 3 re-worked lines — denim, sport and knits and the Denim Fur Technology. 

Out of 1000-2500 items made each season, around a third are upcycled. Each year they upcycle 5.3 tonnes worth of denim jeans, which is up to 7000 pairs, to make about 5000 of new garments. On average 550-700 jeans are upcycled each month.

Demi-denims 
The most famous design by the duo is demi-denims. A combined silhouette of pants which appear to be made out of two separate garments. Demi-denims look just like slim fit jeans from behind, like a skirt or culottes worn on top of slim fit jeans – from the front.

After its debut in 2016 it has instantly gained a success online and among celebrities. Among the latter were Celine Dion and Bella Hadid.

Collaborations 
In March 2019, the brand announces the launch of ISKO x KSENIASCHNAIDER, an eco-denim capsule collection made of ISKO Earth FitTM responsible fabrics. The designers decided to experiment with KSENIASCHNAIDER statement pieces to see how they would perform if made with a completely different fabric. This collection is inspired by KSENIASCHNAIDER best-selling items from the last three years. It features the brand's signature demi-denims, flared jeans, denim shorts, skirts, and cropped jackets. Together, both brands believe in producing responsible fashion that has a low impact on the environment. 

For the spring-summer 2020, KSENIASCHNAIDER collaborated with Belgium-based shoe label MOROBÉ. Together they have produced mules and boots made from leftover denim.

This year, KSENIASCHNAIDER has also created 'anti-easy' capsule line for Isetan Tokyo out of leftover materials in the KSENIASCHNAIDER studio.

Awards 
In 2019 label took place in the Vogue Green Talent shortlist for upcycling an estimated 500 pairs of jeans, or five tonnes of textile and denim per year.

See also 
TTSWTRS

External links 
Official website

References 

Clothing brands of Ukraine